Väski is an island off the coast of  Naantali,  next to Kailo island which houses the theme park Muumimaailma in the Turku archipelago of southern Finland.

The island is a tourist spot and is organised as a location for adventure holidays.

The MTV3 mini film Aarresaaren sankarit was filmed there in 2003.

References
Roger Norum. "Moominworld and Väski Adventure Island." The Rough Guide to Finland. Penguin, Jun 1, 2010

External links
Official website

Other uses
vaski is the Finnish name for copper and its alloys.

Finnish islands in the Baltic
Tourism in Finland
Landforms of Southwest Finland